Hochhauser is a surname. Notable people with the surname include: 

Daniel Hochhauser (born 1957), British oncologist
Heinz Hochhauser (born 1947), Austrian football manager
Victor Hochhauser (1923–2019), British music promoter

See also
Mark Sofer (born 1954), Israeli diplomat, born Mark Hochhauser